Csilla Fórián (born 2 January 1969) is a Hungarian badminton player, born in Debrecen. She competed in women's singles and women's doubles at the 1992 Summer Olympics in Barcelona.

References

External links

1969 births
Living people
Sportspeople from Debrecen
Hungarian female badminton players
Olympic badminton players of Hungary
Badminton players at the 1992 Summer Olympics